Bely Ilmen is a rural locality (a settlement) in Zabuzansky Selsoviet, Krasnoyarsky District, Astrakhan Oblast, Russia. The population was 86 as of 2010. There are 7 streets.

Geography 
Bely Ilmen is located 14 km southwest of Krasny Yar (the district's administrative centre) by road. Vinny is the nearest rural locality.

References 

Rural localities in Krasnoyarsky District, Astrakhan Oblast